Arthur Fellows (1880–unknown) was an English footballer who played in the Football League for Wolverhampton Wanderers.

References

1880 births
English footballers
Association football forwards
English Football League players
Wolverhampton Wanderers F.C. players
Darlaston F.C. players
Halesowen Town F.C. players
Year of death missing